Franz Nölken - 4 November 1918, near La Capelle) was a German Expressionist painter; occasionally associated with Die Brücke, an artists' society in Dresden.

Biography 
Franz Noelken was born 1884 5.May in Hamburg,
At the age of sixteen, he began attending the Johanneum, a liberal arts gymnasium. On the advice of Alfred Lichtwark, the Director of the Hamburger Kunsthalle, he took classes from Arthur Siebelist, who eschewed the Academic approach and took his students to paint en plein aire.

He undertook a study trip to his birthplace, near Soest, in 1905, where he met the businessman, Ernst Rump, a supporter of the arts who would later become his patron. Together with Ahlers-Hestermann and Rosam, he went to Paris in 1907 and mingled with the artists at Le Dôme Café.

In 1908, at the invitation of Karl Schmidt-Rottluff, he joined Die Brücke and exhibited with them in 1909 and 1910. He resigned in 1912, but would return later. Meanwhile, in 1909, he made another trip to Paris, where he studied with Henri Matisse at his short-lived Académie. Upon returning from Paris, he took Anita Rée as a student and, together with Ahlers-Hestermann, created a studio. The arrangement was brief, as Rée apparently fell in love with Nölken and her affections were not returned.

He became a teacher at a private art school for women in 1912. He also made friends with the composer, Max Reger (Nölken was an excellent amateur pianist), and painted numerous portraits of him, one of which was purchased by one of Nölken's patrons, Oskar Troplowitz, to hang in his billiard room. In 1914, he made another trip to Paris.

He almost avoided service in World War I, but was drafted in 1917 and killed a week before the war ended, near La Capelle on the Belgian border. Two streets are named after him, in the Barmbek district of Hamburg and in Soest.

Selected paintings

References

Further reading 
 Franz Nölken 1884–1918. Mit einem Werkverzeichnis der Gemälde und Graphiken, (100th anniversary exhibit) Westfälische Verlagsbuchhandlung Mocker & Jahn, 1984 
 Friederike Weimar: Verglühte Träume: Werke junger Künstler – Opfer des Ersten Weltkriegs. Benno Berneis, Hans Fuglsang, Franz Henseler, Wilhelm Morgner, Franz Nölken, Otto Soltau, Hermann Stenner und Albert Weisgerber. edited by Helga Gutbrod, Mann Verlag/Deutscher Verlag für Kunstwissenschaft, 2014, 
 Carsten Meyer-Tönnesmann: Der Hamburgische Künstlerclub von 1897. Verlag Atelier im Bauernhaus, Fischerhude 1997.

External links 

 ArtNet: More works by Nölken. 
 

1884 births
1918 deaths
20th-century German painters
20th-century German male artists
German male painters
German Expressionist painters
German military personnel killed in World War I
Artists from Hamburg